Athlone Town Stadium, often referred to as Lissywollen is the home stadium of Athlone Town. It has a seating capacity of 2,024 and an overall capacity of 5,000. The stadium was built in 2007, replacing St Mel's Park as the home of the club.

In November 2011, it was reported that Athlone Town had received a donation of €500,000 to wipe out debts incurred through the construction of the stadium.

In 2018, a dispute over ownership of Athlone Town Stadium arose between the club and local businessman Declan Molloy.

The club received grant funding to install artificial turf ahead of the 2019 Season.

References

Association football venues in the Republic of Ireland
Athlone Town A.F.C.
Sports venues in County Westmeath
Buildings and structures in Athlone
Sport in Athlone